Anthony (Tony) Williams-Kenny is a British car designer and is the Director of Design at the Chinese car manufacturer Zotye Auto as of June 2022.

Career
Williams-Kenny graduated from Coventry University in 1997 with a degree in Transport Design and in 1998 with a masters in automotive design.

He worked as a designer for Mitsubishi Motors at their German design centre before joining MG Rover in 2000 as a design manager.

Williams-Kenny joined SAIC in 2005 and worked for the UK based SAIC Motor UK. In 2011 he was promoted to global design director in Shanghai and returned to the UK in 2016.

In September 2018, Williams-Kenny moved to another Chinese car manufacturer, Zotye.

Notable designs
MG Icon concept
MG Zero concept
MG 3
MG HS 
MG 6
MG CS concept
MG GS
Roewe 550

References

British automobile designers
Alumni of Coventry University
Living people
Year of birth missing (living people)